Giacomo Crispo, Bastardo di Crispo (or Jacopo; – 1505) was a governor of the Duchy of the Archipelago in 1494. He was the illegitimate son of William II Crispo, fourteenth Duke of the Archipelago, by an unknown woman.

He married NN and had a son:
 Antonio Crispo, Governor of the Duchy of the Archipelago

References
 

1505 deaths
People from the Duchy of the Archipelago
Giacomo Bastardo
People from the Cyclades
Year of birth unknown